iO Tillett Wright (born September 2, 1985) is an American author, photographer, actor, TV and podcast host, and activist. After growing up in New York City, he founded street art magazine Overspray and served as its editor-in-chief until 2009. From 2010 to 2012 he was a featured columnist for T Magazine with two regular blogs. In 2016, he co-hosted MTV show Suspect with Nev Schulman.

Early life
Wright grew up in New York City with his mother, Rebecca Wright, a poet and actress. He studied in Brockwood Park School in England, UK. Wright is a transgender man. He documented the struggles of his upbringing in his memoir Darling Days.

Career

Editor
In 2002, at the age of 17, Wright founded and served as editor-in-chief of a street art magazine, Overspray, until 2009.

Blogger and writer
From 2010 to 2012, Wright was a featured columnist for T Magazine, at The New York Times where he had two blogs called Notes From The Underground—for which iO reviewed underground performances—and The Lowdown.

Wright's first book, Darling Days, A Memoir was released on September 27, 2016, by Ecco Books, an imprint of HarperCollins.

Wright's second book, Self Evident Truths: 10,000 Portraits of Queer America, has been published on September 15, 2020, by Prestel.

Wright's third book, Oasis: Modern Desert Homes Around The World, has been published in November, 2020, by Clarkson Potter.

Speaker 
In 2012, Wright delivered a talk at TEDxWomen in Washington, DC, called Fifty Shades Of Gay, discussing sexuality and gender as a spectrum. The talk has been viewed over 3 million times.

Photographer
Wright is a self-taught photographer, whose first camera was a Pentax KX.

On September 22, 2010, Wright opened Breedings, his first solo show of photographs, at Fuse Gallery in Manhattan. In August 2011, Wright debuted Camila, his second solo show, and Act Like You're Fine, a group show he curated at Tokyo's Vacant Gallery.

Since 2010, Wright has been working on a project called Self Evident Truths that examines Americans, asking them whether they are "other than straight", and photographing respondents who self-evaluate themselves to be "anything other than 100% straight". To date, Wright has photographed 10,000 people in all 50 of the United States. On September 15, 2020, a monograph, called "Self Evident Truths: 10,000 Portraits of Queer America" that includes all ten thousand images, has been published by Prestel, with a foreword by Black Lives Matter co-founder Patrisse Cullors.

Actor
As an actor, Wright appeared in several independent films, including in a 2004 appearance as a McDonald's worker in Sex and the City, and after an over decade long hiatus, with a part in the feature film Holy New York (2020).

Television host
In 2016, Wright co-hosted the MTV show Suspect with Nev Schulman.

In 2017, Wright was a co-host with Max Joseph, on Episode 6 of Season 6 of MTV's, Catfish: The TV Show.

Podcaster
In 2019, Wright produced and hosted The Ballad Of Billy Balls, a true crime investigation of the murder of the love of his mother's life.

References

External links
 
 

1985 births
Living people
21st-century American photographers
American male artists
LGBT people from New York (state)
American LGBT photographers
Photographers from New York City
The New York Times writers
LGBT media personalities
Transgender men